Coline Mattel (born 3 November 1995) is a French former ski jumper.

At the 2014 Winter Olympics she won a bronze medal becoming the first French ski jumping Olympic medalist. In World Championships in Oslo 2011 she took 3rd place. In World Cup she debuted on 3 December 2011 in Lillehammer where she took 2nd place, her first World Cup podium.

Career
Coline Mattel made her debut in Ladies Continental Cup in Schonach at the age of 11. In her first Junior World Championships in Tarvisio (Italy) in 2007 she was placed 18th. In the Junior World Championships 2009 in Strbske Pleso Mattel won the bronze medal in the individual competition.

In World Championships in Liberec 2009 she took 5th place. She won one training round before the competition with a jump of 99 metres. In the FIS Junior Ski Jumping World Championships 2010 in Hinterzarten she won the silver medal and the gold medal in the FIS Junior Ski Jumping World Championships 2011 in Otepää

Mattel took 1st place in the Ladies Continental Cup (highest level in ladies' ski-jumping) in Notodden 2010/11.

World Cup

Standings

Wins

References

External links
 
 
 
 

1995 births
French female ski jumpers
Living people
FIS Nordic World Ski Championships medalists in ski jumping
Olympic ski jumpers of France
Ski jumpers at the 2014 Winter Olympics
Medalists at the 2014 Winter Olympics
Olympic bronze medalists for France
Olympic medalists in ski jumping